Paul Newallo (born 30 June 1963) is a Trinidad and Tobago swimmer. He competed in two events at the 1984 Summer Olympics.

References

External links
 

1963 births
Living people
Trinidad and Tobago male swimmers
Olympic swimmers of Trinidad and Tobago
Swimmers at the 1984 Summer Olympics
Pan American Games competitors for Trinidad and Tobago
Swimmers at the 1987 Pan American Games
Commonwealth Games competitors for Trinidad and Tobago
Swimmers at the 1982 Commonwealth Games
Place of birth missing (living people)